The Sacculinidae are a family of barnacles belonging to the bizarre parasitic and highly apomorphic infraclass Rhizocephala. The Sacculinidae is one of the two larger families of Rhizocephala, containing six genera:
 Drepanorchis Boschma, 1927
 Heterosaccus Smith, 1906
 Loxothylacus Boschma, 1928
 Ptychascus Boschma, 1933
 Sacculina Thompson, 1836
 Sesarmaxenos Annandale, 1911

References

External links

Barnacles
Taxa named by Wilhelm Lilljeborg
Crustacean genera